Bellot Island is an Arctic island in Quttinirpaaq National Park, Qikiqtaaluk Region, Nunavut, Canada. It is located in Lady Franklin Bay, across from Ellesmere Island's Fort Conger.

Reindeer and muskoxen frequent the island. Though there are no permanent settlements, archaeological research has found evidence of Inuit hearths.

It is named for the French Arctic explorer, Joseph René Bellot.

References

Islands of the Queen Elizabeth Islands
Uninhabited islands of Qikiqtaaluk Region